Leti is a Bantu language of Cameroon, spoken by the Mengisa people.  Most Mengisa have switched to the Eton language, though a number of them continue to use Leti as a secret ritual language.  A smaller number speak Leti as their mother tongue.

Leti is quite close to Tuki and may be a dialect. It is also closely related to Eton.

Mengisa is spoken in the northern part of Sa'a commune (in Lekié department, Central Region).

References

Ritual languages
Mbam languages
Languages of Cameroon